Cascade Park may refer to,

Cascade Park (amusement park)
Cascade Park West, Washington
Cascade Park East, Washington
Cascade Park, New Castle, Pennsylvania
Cascade Park in Duluth
Cascade Park in Yerevan (Monuments of Yerevan#Cascade)

See also
Cascades Park (disambiguation)